The ABRSM (Associated Board of the Royal Schools of Music) is an examination board and registered charity based in the United Kingdom. ABRSM is one of five examination boards accredited by Ofqual to award graded exams and diploma qualifications in music within the UK's National Qualifications Framework (along with the London College of Music, RSL Awards (Rockschool Ltd), Trinity College London, and the Music Teachers' Board). 'The Associated Board of the Royal Schools of Music' was established in 1889 and rebranded as ABRSM in 2009. The clarifying strapline "the exam board of the Royal Schools of Music" was introduced in 2012.

The Royal Schools referred to in ABRSM's title are:
 The Royal Academy of Music
 The Royal College of Music
 The Royal Conservatoire of Scotland
 The Royal Northern College of Music

More than 600,000 candidates take ABRSM exams each year in over 93 countries. ABRSM also provides a publishing house for music which produces syllabus booklets, sheet music and exam papers and runs professional development courses and seminars for teachers.

ABRSM is one of the UK's 200 largest charitable organisations ranked by annual expenditure.

Music Medals 
Music Medals are QCA–accredited music assessments and teaching resources aimed at younger, group-taught learners. Music Medals are distinct from graded music exams in that no external examiners are involved and the initial assessment is made by the teacher.

Teacher training
Since 1995, the CT ABRSM (Certificate of Teaching) designed specifically for music teachers has been offered in addition to the diplomas, albeit as a separate qualification. In 2010, the new CT ABRSM Plus, which combined the DipABRSM and old CT ABRSM, was launched to give teachers access to the DipABRSM. From September 2013, the CT ABRSM Plus stopped being offered in the UK or Singapore for financial reasons. There are also numerous short courses and seminars on music teaching, accompaniment and syllabus instruction available to teachers.

ABRSM publications
ABRSM published its first books in 1918 and its publishing department was first set up in 1921 and was designed to provide suitable music for examinations, performance editions of popular works and new instructional compositions. One of the original editors was Sir Donald Tovey, who wrote informative notes on the music which are still highly regarded today. ABRSM (Publishing) Ltd. was established as a separate company in 1985.

ABRSM digital resources
Since 2009 ABRSM has produced several practice applications to support teachers and students:

 Melody Writer - a tool designed to help improve melody writing and music theory knowledge and understanding
 Aural Trainer - an iPhone app that helps students practice their aural skills
 Speedshifter - a practice tool that allows students to vary the speed of audio without altering the pitch
 Piano Practice Partner - an app for iOS and Android devices that helps students practice exam pieces for piano at Grades 1 to 3. Piano Practice Partner plays one hand so that students can play the other as they learn.

History
The Associated Board of the Royal Schools of Music was founded in 1889 when Alexander Mackenzie, then the Principal of the Royal Academy of Music, and George Grove, founding Director of the Royal College of Music, decided that the two institutions should combine to form an associated examining board to run joint local exams. The first syllabi were published in 1890 for Piano, Organ, Violin, Cello and Harp, with Viola, Double Bass and woodwind instruments added the following year. Originally, the ABRSM had only two grades and were the equivalent of the current grades 6 and 7. Due to the demand for beginner grades, the present structure (grades 1–8) was introduced in 1933. In 1947, the Royal Manchester College of Music (merged to form the present Royal Northern College of Music) and Royal Scottish Academy of Music (now the Royal Conservatoire of Scotland) joined ABRSM. Since the post-World War II years, the ABRSM saw an increase in overseas exam applications. The curriculum also expanded, with the addition of Guitar, Harpsichord, Voice, (with the option of specific exams for "musical theatre" singing at grades 1–3), percussion, Recorder and all brass instruments. The 1990s saw percussion and jazz added to the syllabus. For Diplomas, LRSM was the one that was always available. The DipABRSM and FRSM were introduced much later in the year 2000 as well as similar exams for instructors and teachers. The ARSM was introduced in the year 2016-2017 to serve as a bridge between the Grade 8 and DipABRSM exams.

Ethnic diversity in syllabus

In response to the Black Lives Matter movement, on 15 July, 2020, the ABRSM syllabus came under public scrutiny for the lack of BAME representation in the 2019/20 syllabus. Over 4,000 people signed a petition which found "255 pieces in the new piano syllabus" to not include any black composers. Chi-chi Nwanoku "described the 'woeful lack' of ethnic diversity in the ABRSM syllabus as appalling" with Scott Caizley also stating how "the ABRSM should make its syllabuses less white if it was "committed to seeing a more racially diverse intake of students entering conservatoires". The ABRSM's spokeman responded to the criticism and said "the death of George Floyd in the US had made it think deeply about its efforts to get more black composers in its syllabuses".

References

External links
(UK version)

Performing arts education in the United Kingdom
Classical music in the United Kingdom
Music education in the United Kingdom
English music
Royal Academy of Music
Scottish music
Educational charities based in the United Kingdom
Royal College of Music
Royal Conservatoire of Scotland
1889 establishments in the United Kingdom
Organizations established in 1889